Borrelia turdi, formerly known as Borrelia turdae, is a spirochete bacterium first isolated from specimens of Ixodes tanuki. Its name refers to its reservoir, Turdus merula.

References

Further reading

External links 
NCBI Taxonomy Browser - Borrelia

turdi
Bacteria described in 1996